Zygmunt Andrzej Wielopolski (30 January 1833 in Krakow – 27 February 1902 in Berlin) was the President of Warsaw in the 19th century, during the time when Warsaw was part of Congress Poland.

Mayors of Warsaw
Polish people of the Crimean War (Russian side)